This is a list of NGC objects 1–1000 from the New General Catalogue (NGC). The astronomical catalogue is composed mainly of star clusters, nebulae, and galaxies. Other objects in the catalogue can be found in the other subpages of the list of NGC objects.

The constellation information in these tables is from The Complete New General Catalogue and Index Catalogue of Nebulae and Star Clusters by J. L. E. Dreyer, which was accessed using the VizieR Service. Galaxy morphological types and objects that are members of the Small Magellanic Cloud are identified using the NASA/IPAC Extragalactic Database. The other data of these tables are from the SIMBAD Astronomical Database unless otherwise stated.

1–100

101–200

201–300

301–400

401–500

501–600

601–700

701–800

801–900

901–1000

See also
 Lists of astronomical objects

References

 1
NGC objects 0001-0999

cs:Seznam NGC objektů 1-250
de:Liste der NGC-Objekte von 1 bis 500
lb:NGC-Objete vun 1 bis 500
pt:Anexo:Lista de objetos NGC (1-499)
sk:Zoznam NGC objektov 1-250